Gratiola floridana, the Florida hedge hyssop, is a species of annual forb native to the southeast United States. It grows in wet areas.

Distribution
It is found in six states of the Southeast United States (Florida, Georgia, Louisiana, Mississippi, Alabama, and Tennessee)
but is endangered or vulnerable in all but Florida and Alabama.

References

floridana